The 2009–10 Serbian Cup season was the fourth season of the Serbian national football tournament. The competition started on 2 September 2009 and ended with the Final on 5 May 2010. The defending champions are FK Partizan.

Red Star Belgrade won the cup after a 3–0 win against Vojvodina.

Preliminary round
A preliminary round was held in order to reduce the number of teams competing in the next round to 32 and featured six teams from Serbian lower divisions. The matches were played on 2 September 2009.

|}
Note: Roman numerals in brackets denote the league tier the clubs participate in during the 2009–10 season.

Round of 32
In this round entered three winners from the previous round as well as all 12 teams from Serbian SuperLiga from 2008–09 and all 18 teams from Serbian First League from 2008–09. The matches were played on 22–23 September 2009.

|}
Note: Roman numerals in brackets denote the league tier the clubs participate in during the 2009–10 season.

Round of 16
The matches were played on 28 October 2009.

|}
Note: Roman numerals in brackets denote the league tier the clubs participate in during the 2009–10 season.

Quarter-finals
The matches were played on 25 November 2009.

|}

Semi-finals

Final

References

External links
 Serbian Cup on rsssf.org
 Serbian Cup on futbol24.com

2009–10
Cup
2009–10 domestic association football cups